The Embassy of Japan in Ukraine is located in the Pechersk district of Kyiv, near the building of the Cabinet of Ministers of Ukraine. It is being headed by an extraordinary and plenipotentiary ambassador.

History 
Until January 19, 1993, the Embassy of Japan in Ukraine was part-time Embassy of Japan in Moscow, Russia. On 14 February 2022, the embassy was temporarily relocated to Lviv, as fears mounted of a possible Russian invasion of Ukraine.

Ambassadors to Ukraine 

List of Ambassadors of Japan to Ukraine:

   (June 12, 1992 - April 13, 1993) Office held in Moscow till 19 January 1993.
   (April 13, 1993 - October 1, 1996)
   (October 21, 1996 - May 28, 1999)
   (July 21, 1999 - September 1, 2002)
   (September 20, 2002 - September 30, 2005)
   (October 4, 2005 - September 1, 2008)
   (September 3, 2008 - August 26, 2011)
   (September 1, 2011 - August 29, 2014)
   (August 29, 2014 - November 26, 2018)
 Kurai Takashi  (December 4, 2018 - August 27, 2021) Inaugurated as of 23 January 2019.
   (August 27, 2021 - )

See also 

 Embassy of Ukraine in Japan

References

External links 

 (Ukr.) Official page of the Embassy of Japan in Ukraine

Japan–Ukraine relations
Diplomatic missions of Japan
Japan